Herman Dune is a Swedish-French act based in San Pedro, Los Angeles. The band has been described as Indie rock, Anti-folk, Folk rock, Alternative rock, Americana, and Alternative country.

History 
Herman Dune was established as a trio with brothers David Ivar and André singing and writing, and drummer Omé, David Ivar's childhood friend. In 2000, they released their debut album, They Go To The Woods.

In 2001, drummer Neman joined Herman Dune for their following albums, Switzerland Heritage, Mash Concrete Metal Mushroom, Mas Cambios, and Not On Top.

Herman Dune then released Giant in 2006, Next Year In Zion in 2008, and Strange Moosic in 2011. In 2006, Andre left the band after recording songs for Giant.

After a hiatus and relocation to San Pedro, Los Angeles in 2015, David Ivar released Sweet Thursday on Santa Cruz Records and Santa Cruz Gold on Santa Cruz Records, both in 2018.

Between 2013 and 2018, while still performing as Herman Dune, David Ivar also performed as Black Yaya, with the eponymous album Black Yaya and the album Rattle Snake, a concept album about Bonnie and Clyde.

Since 2006, André has been pursuing his own solo career as Stanley Brinks. Omé earned his MD and PhD and works as a physician at Hôpital Bichat-Claude-Bernard in Paris. Néman is the frontman of the band Zombie Zombie.

Discography

Albums
 Turn Off the Light (2000, Prohibited Records)
 They Go to the Woods (2001, Shrimper Records)
 Switzerland Heritage (2001, Prohibited Records)
 The Whys and the Hows of Herman Dune & Cerberus Shoal (with Cerberus Shoal) (2002, North East Indie Records )
 Mas Cambios (2003, The Track & Field Organisation)
 Mash Concrete Metal Mushroom (2003, Shrimper Records)
 Not on Top (2005, The Track & Field Organisation)
 Giant (2006, Source Etc.)
 Next Year in Zion (Fall 2008, Source Etc., Everloving Records, Cityslang)
 Strange Moosic (May 2011, Indie Europe/Zoom)
 Mariage à Mendoza (2013, Strange Moosic/Gum)
Sweet Thursday (2018, Santa Cruz Records)
Santa Cruz Gold (2018, Santa Cruz Records)
Notes from Vinegar Hill (2020, B B * Island)

Singles
 Money Makers on My Back (1997, self release)
 Glow in the Dark EP (1998, Ruminance Records)
 The Fire EP (2000, Prohibited Records)
 Between the Little Houses (2001, Prohibited Records)
 A Wiser Man (2004, Hype City Records)
 Jackson Heights EP (2005, The Track & Field Organisation)
 Not on top (2006, The Track & Field Organisation)
 I Wish That I Could See You Soon (2007, Source Etc.)
 1-2-3 / Apple Tree (2008, [2008, Source Etc.)
 My Home Is Nowhere Without You (2008, Everloving Records)
 Tell Me Something I Don't Know (2011, Indie Europe/Zoom)

Notes

External links
 Herman Dune
 Herman Dune on Label Gum (Green United Music)
 Herman Dune on Discogs
 MySpace
 Live review - Herman Dune – The Shed, Cambridge, 19 April 2007 on The Line Of Best Fit
 "Herman Dúne omgivna av myter", interview in Svenska Dagbladet, 2 January 2007 (Swedish)
 Herman Dune plays with Turner Cody on 60 seasons, a compilation 2000-2005
 Pitchfork review, I Wish That I Could See You Soon
 'Next Year in Zion' Song by Song descriptions by Daid-Ivar Herman Dune, November 2008

French rock music groups
French folk music groups
French folk rock groups
City Slang artists
Shrimper Records artists
Musical groups from Paris